Kingsburg High School (KHS) is a public high school in Kingsburg, California, United States. The school is part of the Kingsburg Joint Union High School District. Its mascot is the Viking and its school colors are green and gold. As of 2018, the enrollment was 1,071 students.

Academic Achievements
Kingsburg High School's academic achievements include:
A graduation rate of 99.6% in 2019.
72.2% of students qualified as college/career ready in 2019
72% of students met or exceeded standard in ELA (#8 in Fresno/Tulare Counties)
46.9% of students met or exceeded standard in MATH (#5 in Fresno/Tulare Counties)

Resources
The resources offered to students by Kingsburg High school include a college and career center dedicated to helping students plan for life after leaving high school, a laptop program that provides each student with a functioning computer to be used for school related activities and assignments, and two different versions of many of the online resources/documents, one in Spanish and one in English, to accommodate to the school's number of Spanish speaking students and parents.

Annual Events
The events put on annually by Kingsburg High School include:
Rivalry week
Homecoming week
Dances: Homecoming, Formal, Back to school dance, Sadie's, and Prom
Rotary top 40 dinner
FFA Tri-tip dinner

Athletics
Kingsburg High School competes in the Central Section of the California Interscholastic Federation as a member of the Central Sequoia League (CSL).

Fall
Football
Volleyball
Cross country
Girls' golf
Boys' water polo
Girls' water polo
Girls' tennis
Viking Marching Band

Winter
Boys' basketball
Girls' basketball
Boys' soccer
Girls' soccer
Wrestling

Spring
Baseball
Softball
Swimming & diving
Track & field
Boys' golf
Boys' tennis

Notable alumni
 Tyler Bray, current NFL player
 Monte Clark, former NFL player and head coach
 Jimmy Johnson, former NFL player
 Rafer Johnson,  Olympic decathlon gold medalist
 Goran Lingmerth, former NFL player
 Melissa Price, women's pole vault pioneer
 Jake Woods, former Major League Baseball player

References

High schools in Fresno County, California
Public high schools in California
1908 establishments in California
Educational institutions established in 1908